Scolioplecta araea is a species of moth of the family Tortricidae. It is found in Australia in Queensland and the Northern Territory.

The wingspan is about 10 mm. The forewings are whitish, with some fine fuscous strigulae (fine streaks). The hindwings are pale grey.

References

Moths described in 1916
Phricanthini